De Soto is a city in Dallas County, Iowa, United States. The population was 915 at the time of the 2020 census. It is part of the Des Moines–West Des Moines Metropolitan Statistical Area.

History
De Soto got its start in the year 1868, following construction of the Chicago, Rock Island and Pacific Railroad through the territory. De Soto is the name of a railroad official.

Geography
De Soto is located at  (41.531060, -94.008423).

Demographics

2010 census
As of the census of 2010, there were 1,050 people, 388 households, and 291 families living in the city. The racial makeup of the city was 96.6% White, 0.7% African American, 0.5% Native American, 0.2% Asian, 0.8% from other races, and 1.3% from two or more races. Hispanic or Latino of any race were 1.8% of the population.

There were 388 households, of which 40.2% had children under the age of 18 living with them, 61.3% were married couples living together, 8.0% had a female householder with no husband present, 5.7% had a male householder with no wife present, and 25.0% were non-families. 18.8% of all households were made up of individuals, and 6% had someone living alone who was 65 years of age or older. The average household size was 2.71 and the average family size was 3.10.

The median age in the city was 34.6 years. 28.9% of residents were under the age of 18; 6.2% were between the ages of 18 and 24; 30.2% were from 25 to 44; 24.9% were from 45 to 64; and 9.6% were 65 years of age or older. The gender makeup of the city was 51.0% male and 49.0% female.

2000 census
As of the census of 2000, there were 1,009 people, 374 households, and 283 families living in the city. The racial makeup of the city was 99.21% White, 0.10% Native American, 0.20% Asian, 0.10% from other races, and 0.40% from two or more races. Hispanic or Latino of any race were 0.69% of the population.

There were 374 households, out of which 40.6% had children under the age of 18 living with them, 65.5% were married couples living together, 8.3% had a female householder with no husband present, and 24.1% were non-families. 17.4% of all households were made up of individuals, and 4.5% had someone living alone who was 65 years of age or older. The average household size was 2.70 and the average family size was 3.09.

In the city, the population was spread out, with 28.8% under the age of 18, 8.0% from 18 to 24, 32.1% from 25 to 44, 24.1% from 45 to 64, and 6.9% who were 65 years of age or older. The median age was 34 years. For every 100 females, there were 103.0 males. For every 100 females age 18 and over, there were 100.0 males.

The median income for a household in the city was $48,816, and the median income for a family was $51,397. Males had a median income of $31,250 versus $23,784 for females. The per capita income for the city was $17,464. About 3.7% of families and 3.3% of the population were below the poverty line, including 3.0% of those under age 18 and 3.2% of those age 65 or over.

Education
De Soto is within the Adel–De Soto–Minburn Community School District. The district formed on July 1, 1993, as a result of the merger of the Adel–De Soto Community School District and the Central Dallas Community School District.

References

Cities in Iowa
Cities in Dallas County, Iowa
Des Moines metropolitan area
1868 establishments in Iowa
Populated places established in 1868